Anna Anthropy is an American video game designer, role-playing game designer, and interactive fiction author whose works include Mighty Jill Off and Dys4ia.  She is the game designer in residence at the DePaul University College of Computing and Digital Media.

She has also gone by the name Auntie Pixelante.

Career

Game design
In 2010, working with Koduco, a game development company based in San Francisco, Anthropy helped develop the iPad game "Pong Vaders". In 2011, she released Lesbian Spider Queens of Mars, an homage to Midway's 1981 arcade game Wizard of Wor with a queer theme and "some fun commentary on master-slave dynamics." In 2012, she released Dys4ia, an autobiographical game about her experiences with hormone replacement therapy that "[allows] the player to experience a simulation or approximation of what she went through." Anthropy says her games explore the relationship between sadism and game design, and bills them as challenging players' expectations about what the developer should create and how the player should be reprimanded for errors. Triad was included in the Chicago New Media 1973-1992 exhibition curated by Jon Cates.

Rise of the Videogame Zinesters
Anthropy's first book, Rise of the Videogame Zinesters, was published in 2012. In an interview at the time of its release, Anthropy said it promotes the idea of "small, interesting, personal experiences by hobbyist authors ... Zinesters exists to be a kind of ambassador for that idea of what video games can be." The book also deals with a detailed analysis of the mechanics and potentialities of digital games, including the idea that games can be more usefully compared to theater than film ("There is always a scene called World 1-2, although each performance of World 1-2 will be different") and the role of chance in games. Anthropy also criticizes what she refers to as the video game industry being run by the corporate "elite" which design video games to be formulaic and do not take creative risks. Zinester wants consumers to see video games as having "cultural and artistic value" similar to artistic mediums such as comic books. The video game industry being run by "elites" does not allow for a diverse cast of voices, such as queer voices, to give their input in game development and design and stifles the creative process. As Anthropy puts it, "I have to strain to find any game that's about a queer woman, to find any game that resembles my own experience."

Games

Afternoon in the House of Secrets (on The Internet Archive)
And the Robot Horse You Rode In On (on itch.io)
Calamity Annie
Dys4ia (on freegames.org)
Encyclopedia Fuckme and the Case of the Vanishing Entree
Gay Cats Go to the Weird Weird Woods (on itch.io)
The Hunt for the Gay Planet
I Love You, Alive Girl (on Anthropy's website and Hibernation Games anthology on itch.io)
Jennifer Janowski is Doomed (on itch.io and The Museum of ZZT)
Keep Me Occupied (on itch.io)
Mighty Jill Off
Ohmygod Are You Alright
Police Bear
Pong Vaders (on iTunes)
Princess with a Cursed Sword (on itch.io)
Queers in love at the end of the world (on itch.io)
Redder (on itch.io)
Tavern At the End Of the World  (on itch.io)
Triad (on itch.io)
When Pigs Fly

Bibliography
 Rise of the Videogame Zinesters Seven Stories Press, 2012.  
 ZZT Boss Fight Books, 2014. 
 The State of Play: Creators and Critics on Video Game Culture. Seven Stories Press, 2015. 
 A Game Design Vocabulary: Exploring the Foundational Principles Behind Good Game Design. Addison-Wesley Professional, 2014. 
Make Your Own Twine Games! No Starch Press, 2019. 
Make Your Own Scratch Games! No Starch Press, 2019. 
Make Your Own Puzzlescript Games! No Starch Press, 2019.

See also
List of electronic literature authors, critics, and works
Hypertext fiction
Interactive fiction

References

External links
  – Anthropy's official website
 The Gamer's Quarter

Living people
American video game designers
American critics
Transgender artists
Year of birth missing (living people)
Transgender women
Women video game developers
Southern Methodist University alumni
State University of New York at Purchase alumni
Queer women
Queer writers
21st-century American LGBT people
Electronic literature writers
American transgender writers